Key to the City is a 1950 American romantic comedy film starring Clark Gable and Loretta Young as mayors who meet in San Francisco, and despite their contrasting personalities and views, fall in love. It was the final film role of Frank Morgan and Clara Blandick.

Plot
Steve Fisk (Clark Gable) is the mayor of a municipality called Puget City. At a convention in San Francisco, he mistakes Clarissa Standish (Loretta Young), the mayor of Wenonah, Maine, for a "balloon dancer" he was expecting.

A former longshoreman, Steve feels that Clarissa might be too refined a woman for him, but he is definitely attracted. He needs to be careful, however, because a crooked city councilman Les Taggart (Raymond Burr) would love to have any hint of scandal to use against Steve politically back home.

Steve proceeds to inadvertently get Clarissa arrested twice - first after a brawl in a Chinatown restaurant, then on their way to a costume party. A photographer clicks a picture of Clarissa making it appear she is at the police station for public drunkenness. She does not think it funny, but her uncle, Judge Silas Standish (Lewis Stone), is privately delighted that the prim Clarissa seems to finally be loosening up.

The balloon dancer, Sheila (Marilyn Maxwell), shows up, causing Clarissa to conclude incorrectly that Steve is going to see her. And she is irate when Steve disappears, unaware that he had to hurry home for a hastily called council vote. The truth is, Steve wants to marry Clarissa, and cannot wait to present her with the key to his city.

Cast

Reception
According to MGM records, the film earned $2,296,000 in the US and Canada, and $677,000 elsewhere, resulting in a profit of $298,000.

References

Further reading

External links
 
 
 
 

1950 films
1950 romantic comedy films
American black-and-white films
Films directed by George Sidney
Films scored by Bronisław Kaper
Metro-Goldwyn-Mayer films
American political films
American romantic comedy films
1950s English-language films
1950s American films